Station Road Ground is a cricket ground located off Station Road in Whalley, Lancashire. The ground is bordered to the north and west by other sports fields, while to the south it is bordered by residential housing and to the east by the Ribble Valley Line and Whalley railway station.

The ground was established in 1860, five years after the founding of Whalley Cricket Club. The first recorded match on the ground was in 1864, when Whalley played an All-England Eleven. Three years later the ground held the only first-class match to be played there, between Lancashire played Yorkshire in what was the first Roses Match. Yorkshire won this first fixture by an innings and 56 runs, with Lancashire's Arthur Appleby taking the first five wicket haul in the match with 6/62 in Yorkshire's first-innings, but he surpassed by Yorkshire's George Freeman who took 7/10 in Lancashire first-innings and 5/41 in their follow-on. The ground is still used by Whalley Cricket Club.

See also
List of cricket grounds in England and Wales

References

External links
Station Road at ESPNcricinfo
Station Road at CricketArchive

Cricket grounds in Lancashire
Buildings and structures in Ribble Valley
Sport in Ribble Valley
Sports venues completed in 1860